The Archdeacon of St Andrews was the head of the Archdeaconry of St Andrews, a sub-division of the Diocese of St Andrews, from the twelfth to the seventeenth century. The position was one of the most important positions within the medieval Scottish church; because of his area's large population and high number of parish churches, the Archdeacon of St Andrews may have exercised more power than many Scottish bishops. The following is a list of known archdeacons:

List of Archdeacons of St Andrews
 Matthew, 1147 x 1152-1172
 Walter de Roxburgh, 1173-1179 x 1188
 Hugh de Roxburgh, 1189 x 1194-1199
 Ranulf de Wat, 1199-1209
 Laurence de Thorenton, 1209-1238 x 1240
 Adam, 1240-1248
 Abel de Golynn, 1250-1254
 William Wishart, 1254-1273
 Alpín of Strathearn, 1278
 Gregory, 1279-1295
 John Fraser, 1296-1297
 Roger de Kingston, 1299
 Adam de Mauchan/Machane, 1301-1304
 ?
 Robert de Lamberton, 1319-1323
 James Bane, 1325-1328.
 William de Lindsay 1330.
 William de Pilmuir, 1340-1345 x 1353
 Henry Stupy, x 1353.
 William Wys, 1353-1354
 William de Greenlaw, 1353-1373
 William de Chisholm, 1367
 John de Peebles (Peblis), 1374 -1378 x 1379
 Andrew de Trebrun, 1378
 Thomas Stewart, 1380-1430
 George Newton	1430 x 1431-1433
 Richard de Creich, 1430-1432.
 Thomas de Myrton (Merton), 1431-1433
 William de Foulis, 1432-1441
 John Legat, 1443-1451
 Hugh Kennedy, x 1452 (?), 1454
 John Kennedy, 1454
 Hugh Douglas, 1454-1456 x 1457
 Walter Stewart, 1456 x 1457-1472 x 1474
 Hugh Douglas, 1466
 William Scheves 1472 x 1474-1478
 Robert Blackadder, 1477-1480
 Andrew Stewart, 1479
 Alexander Inglis, 1480-1496.
 John Ireland, 1483-1485
 Robert de Fontibus (Wells), 1497-1501
 Alexander Stewart, 1502-1504
 Gavin Dunbar, 1504-1519
 Thomas Halkerston 1519-1521 x 1524
 John Cantuly, 1524-1537
 George Durie, 1526-1559
 Robert Pitcairn, 1539-1584.
 George Young, 1584-1603.
 Alexander Gledstanes, 1612-1638

Notes

Bibliography
 Watt, D.E.R., Fasti Ecclesiae Scotinanae Medii Aevi ad annum 1638, 2nd Draft, (St Andrews, 1969), pp. 304–9

See also
 Archdeacon of Lothian
 Bishop of St Andrews

St Andrews
History of Fife
St Andrews
Religion in Fife